This is a list of the bird species recorded in Brunei. The avifauna of Brunei include a total of 504 species, of which 5 have been introduced by humans.

This list's taxonomic treatment (designation and sequence of orders, families and species) and nomenclature (common and scientific names) follow the conventions of The Clements Checklist of the Birds of the World, 2022 edition. The family accounts at the beginning of each heading reflect this taxonomy, as do the species counts found in each family account. Introduced and accidental species are included in the total counts for Brunei.

The following tags have been used to highlight several categories, but not all species fall into one of these categories. Those that do not are commonly occurring native species.

 (A) Accidental - a species that rarely or accidentally occurs in Brunei
 (E) Endemic - a species endemic to Brunei
 (I) Introduced - a species introduced to Brunei as a consequence, direct or indirect, of human actions

Ducks, geese, and waterfowl
Order: AnseriformesFamily: Anatidae

Anatidae includes the ducks and most duck-like waterfowl, such as geese and swans. These birds are adapted to an aquatic existence with webbed feet, flattened bills, and feathers that are excellent at shedding water due to an oily coating.

Wandering whistling-duck, Dendrocygna arcuata
Lesser whistling-duck, Dendrocygna javanica
Garganey, Spatula querquedula
Northern shoveler, Spatula clypeata
Mallard, Anas platyrhynchos
Northern pintail, Anas acuta
Green-winged teal, Anas crecca
Tufted duck, Aythya fuligula

Megapodes
Order: GalliformesFamily: Megapodiidae

The Megapodiidae are stocky, medium-large chicken-like birds with small heads and large feet. All but the malleefowl occupy jungle habitats and most have brown or black coloring. 

Tabon scrubfowl, Megapodius cumingii

Pheasants, grouse, and allies
Order: GalliformesFamily: Phasianidae

The Phasianidae are a family of terrestrial birds which consists of quails, partridges, snowcocks, francolins, spurfowls, tragopans, monals, pheasants, peafowls and jungle fowls. In general, they are plump (although they vary in size) and have broad, relatively short wings.

Crested partridge, Rollulus rouloul
Black partridge, Melanoperdix nigra
Bulwer's pheasant, Lophura bulweri
Bornean crestless fireback, Lophura pyronota
Bornean crested fireback, Lophura ignita
Great argus, Argusianus argus
Blue-breasted quail, Synoicus chinensis

Pigeons and doves
Order: ColumbiformesFamily: Columbidae

Pigeons and doves are stout-bodied birds with short necks and short slender bills with a fleshy cere.

Rock pigeon, Columba livia (I)
Metallic pigeon, Columba vitiensis
Philippine collared-dove, Streptopelia dusumieri (A)
Spotted dove, Streptopelia chinensis
Philippine cuckoo-dove, Macropygia tenuirostris
Little cuckoo-dove, Macropygia ruficeps
Asian emerald dove, Chalcophaps indica
Zebra dove, Geopelia striata
Nicobar pigeon, Caloenas nicobarica
Little green-pigeon, Treron olax
Pink-necked green-pigeon, Treron vernans
Cinnamon-headed green-pigeon, Treron fulvicollis
Thick-billed green-pigeon, Treron curvirostra
Large green-pigeon, Treron capellei
Jambu fruit-dove, Ptilinopus jambu
Green imperial-pigeon, Ducula aenea
Mountain imperial-pigeon, Ducula badia
Pied imperial-pigeon, Ducula bicolor

Cuckoos
Order: CuculiformesFamily: Cuculidae

The family Cuculidae includes cuckoos, roadrunners and anis. These birds are of variable size with slender bodies, long tails and strong legs.

Bornean ground-cuckoo, Carpococcyx radiatus
Short-toed coucal, Centropus rectunguis
Greater coucal, Centropus sinensis
Lesser coucal, Centropus bengalensis
Raffles's malkoha, Rhinortha chlorophaea
Red-billed malkoha, Zanclostomus javanicus
Chestnut-breasted malkoha, Phaenicophaeus curvirostris
Chestnut-bellied malkoha, Phaenicophaeus sumatranus
Black-bellied malkoha, Phaenicophaeus diardi
Asian koel, Eudynamys scolopacea
Violet cuckoo, Chrysococcyx xanthorhynchus
Horsfield's bronze-cuckoo, Chrysococcyx basalis
Little bronze-cuckoo, Chrysococcyx minutillus
Banded bay cuckoo, Cacomantis sonneratii
Plaintive cuckoo, Cacomantis merulinus
Brush cuckoo, Cacomantis variolosus
Square-tailed drongo-cuckoo, Surniculus lugubris
Moustached hawk-cuckoo, Hierococcyx vagans
Dark hawk-cuckoo, Hierococcyx bocki
Malaysian hawk-cuckoo, Hierococcyx fugax
Indian cuckoo, Cuculus micropterus
Himalayan cuckoo, Cuculus saturatus

Frogmouths
Order: CaprimulgiformesFamily: Podargidae

The frogmouths are a group of nocturnal birds related to the nightjars. They are named for their large flattened hooked bill and huge frog-like gape, which they use to take insects.

Large frogmouth, Batrachostomus auritus
Gould's frogmouth, Batrachostomus stellatus
Bornean frogmouth, Batrachostomus mixtus
Blyth's frogmouth, Batrachostomus affinis
Sunda frogmouth, Batrachostomus cornutus

Nightjars and allies
Order: CaprimulgiformesFamily: Caprimulgidae

Nightjars are medium-sized nocturnal birds which usually nest on the ground. They have long wings, short legs and very short bills. Most have small feet, of little use for walking, and long pointed wings. Their soft plumage is camouflaged to resemble bark or leaves.

Malaysian eared-nightjar, Lyncornis temminckii
Gray nightjar, Caprimulgus jotaka
Large-tailed nightjar, Caprimulgus macrurus
Savanna nightjar, Caprimulgus affinis
Bonaparte's nightjar, Caprimulgus concretus

Swifts
Order: CaprimulgiformesFamily: Apodidae

Swifts are small birds which spend the majority of their lives flying. These birds have very short legs and never settle voluntarily on the ground, perching instead only on vertical surfaces. Many swifts have long swept-back wings which resemble a crescent or boomerang. 

Silver-rumped needletail, Rhaphidura leucopygialis
White-throated needletail, Hirundapus caudacutus
Brown-backed needletail, Hirundapus giganteus
Waterfall swift, Hydrochous gigas (A)
Plume-toed swiftlet, Collocalia affinis
Ameline swiftlet, Aerodramus amelis
Mossy-nest swiftlet, Aerodramus salangana
Black-nest swiftlet, Aerodramus maximus
White-nest swiftlet, Aerodramus fuciphagus
Pacific swift, Apus pacificus
House swift, Apus nipalensis
Asian palm-swift, Cypsiurus balasiensis

Treeswifts
Order: CaprimulgiformesFamily: Hemiprocnidae

The treeswifts, also called crested swifts, are closely related to the true swifts. They differ from the other swifts in that they have crests, long forked tails and softer plumage.

Gray-rumped treeswift, Hemiprocne longipennis
Whiskered treeswift, Hemiprocne comata

Rails, gallinules, and coots
Order: GruiformesFamily: Rallidae

Rallidae is a large family of small to medium-sized birds which includes the rails, crakes, coots and gallinules. Typically they inhabit dense vegetation in damp environments near lakes, swamps or rivers. In general they are shy and secretive birds, making them difficult to observe. Most species have strong legs and long toes which are well adapted to soft uneven surfaces. They tend to have short, rounded wings and to be weak fliers.

Brown-cheeked rail, Rallus indicus (A)
Slaty-breasted rail, Lewinia striata
Eurasian moorhen, Gallinula chloropus
Eurasian coot, Fulica atra
White-browed crake, Poliolimnas cinereus
Watercock, Gallicrex cinerea
White-breasted waterhen, Amaurornis phoenicurus
Red-legged crake, Rallina fasciata
Baillon's crake, Zapornia pusilla

Cranes
Order: GruiformesFamily: Gruidae

Cranes are large, long-legged and long-necked birds. Unlike the similar-looking but unrelated herons, cranes fly with necks outstretched, not pulled back. Most have elaborate and noisy courting displays or "dances".

Sarus crane, Antigone antigone

Thick-knees
Order: CharadriiformesFamily: Burhinidae

The thick-knees are a group of largely tropical waders in the family Burhinidae. They are found worldwide within the tropical zone, with some species also breeding in the temperate zones Europe and Australia. They are medium to large waders with strong black or yellow-black bills, large yellow eyes and cryptic plumage. Despite being classed as waders, most species have a preference for arid or semi-arid habitats.

Beach thick-knee, Esacus magnirostris

Stilts and avocets
Order: CharadriiformesFamily: Recurvirostridae

Recurvirostridae is a family of large wading birds, which includes the avocets and stilts. The avocets have long legs and long up-curved bills. The stilts have extremely long legs and long, thin, straight bills.

Black-winged stilt, Himantopus himantopus (A)
Pied stilt, Himantopus leucocephalus

Plovers and lapwings
Order: CharadriiformesFamily: Charadriidae

The family Charadriidae includes the plovers, dotterels and lapwings. They are small to medium-sized birds with compact bodies, short, thick necks and long, usually pointed, wings. They are found in open country worldwide, mostly in habitats near water. 

Black-bellied plover, Pluvialis squatarola
Pacific golden-plover, Pluvialis fulva
Northern lapwing, Vanellus vanellus
Gray-headed lapwing, Vanellus cinereus
Lesser sand-plover, Charadrius mongolus
Greater sand-plover, Charadrius leschenaultii
Malaysian plover, Charadrius peronii
Kentish plover, Charadrius alexandrinus
White-faced plover, Charadrius dealbatus
Common ringed plover, Charadrius hiaticula
Long-billed plover, Charadrius placidus
Little ringed plover, Charadrius dubius
Oriental plover, Charadrius veredus

Painted-snipes
Order: CharadriiformesFamily: Rostratulidae

Painted-snipes are short-legged, long-billed birds similar in shape to the true snipes, but more brightly colored.

Greater painted-snipe, Rostratula benghalensis

Sandpipers and allies
Order: CharadriiformesFamily: Scolopacidae

Scolopacidae is a large diverse family of small to medium-sized shorebirds including the sandpipers, curlews, godwits, shanks, tattlers, woodcocks, snipes, dowitchers and phalaropes. The majority of these species eat small invertebrates picked out of the mud or soil. Variation in length of legs and bills enables multiple species to feed in the same habitat, particularly on the coast, without direct competition for food.

Whimbrel, Numenius phaeopus
Little curlew, Numenius minutus
Far Eastern curlew, Numenius madagascariensis
Eurasian curlew, Numenius arquata
Bar-tailed godwit, Limosa lapponica
Black-tailed godwit, Limosa limosa
Ruddy turnstone, Arenaria interpres
Great knot, Calidris tenuirostris
Red knot, Calidris canutus
Ruff, Calidris pugnax
Broad-billed sandpiper, Calidris falcinellus
Sharp-tailed sandpiper, Calidris acuminata
Curlew sandpiper, Calidris ferruginea
Temminck's stint, Calidris temminckii
Long-toed stint, Calidris subminuta
Red-necked stint, Calidris ruficollis
Sanderling, Calidris alba
Dunlin, Calidris alpina (A)
Little stint, Calidris minuta
Asian dowitcher, Limnodromus semipalmatus
Long-billed dowitcher, Limnodromus scolopaceus (A)
Eurasian woodcock, Scolopax rusticola
Common snipe, Gallinago gallinago
Pin-tailed snipe, Gallinago stenura
Swinhoe's snipe, Gallinago megala
Terek sandpiper, Xenus cinereus
Red-necked phalarope, Phalaropus lobatus (A)
Common sandpiper, Actitis hypoleucos
Green sandpiper, Tringa ochropus
Gray-tailed tattler, Tringa brevipes
Spotted redshank, Tringa erythropus (A)
Common greenshank, Tringa nebularia
Marsh sandpiper, Tringa stagnatilis
Wood sandpiper, Tringa glareola
Common redshank, Tringa totanus

Pratincoles and coursers
Order: CharadriiformesFamily: Glareolidae

Glareolidae is a family of wading birds comprising the pratincoles, which have short legs, long pointed wings and long forked tails, and the coursers, which have long legs, short wings and long, pointed bills which curve downwards.

Oriental pratincole, Glareola maldivarum

Skuas and jaegers
Order: CharadriiformesFamily: Stercorariidae

The family Stercorariidae are, in general, medium to large birds, typically with gray or brown plumage, often with white markings on the wings. They nest on the ground in temperate and arctic regions and are long-distance migrants.

Pomarine jaeger, Stercorarius pomarinus

Gulls, terns, and skimmers
Order: CharadriiformesFamily: Laridae

Laridae is a family of medium to large seabirds, the gulls, terns and skimmers. Gulls are typically gray or white, often with black markings on the head or wings. They have stout, longish bills and webbed feet. Terns are a group of generally medium to large seabirds typically with gray or white plumage, often with black markings on the head. Most terns hunt fish by diving but some pick insects off the surface of fresh water. Terns are generally long-lived birds, with several species known to live in excess of 30 years.

Black-headed gull, Chroicocephalus ridibundus
Brown noddy, Anous stolidus
Bridled tern, Onychoprion anaethetus
Little tern, Sternula albifrons
Gull-billed tern, Gelochelidon nilotica
Caspian tern, Hydroprogne caspia
White-winged tern, Chlidonias leucopterus
Whiskered tern, Chlidonias hybrida
Roseate tern, Sterna dougallii
Black-naped tern, Sterna sumatrana
Common tern, Sterna hirundo
Great crested tern, Thalasseus bergii
Lesser crested tern, Thalasseus bengalensis

Shearwaters and petrels
Order: ProcellariiformesFamily: Procellariidae

The procellariids are the main group of medium-sized "true petrels", characterized by united nostrils with medium septum and a long outer functional primary.

Streaked shearwater, Calonectris leucomelas (A)

Storks
Order: CiconiiformesFamily: Ciconiidae

Storks are large, long-legged, long-necked, wading birds with long, stout bills. Storks are mute, but bill-clattering is an important mode of communication at the nest. Their nests can be large and may be reused for many years. Many species are migratory.

Storm's stork, Ciconia stormi
Lesser adjutant, Leptoptilos javanicus

Frigatebirds
Order: SuliformesFamily: Fregatidae

Frigatebirds are large seabirds usually found over tropical oceans. They are large, black-and-white or completely black, with long wings and deeply forked tails. The males have colored inflatable throat pouches. They do not swim or walk and cannot take off from a flat surface. Having the largest wingspan-to-body-weight ratio of any bird, they are essentially aerial, able to stay aloft for more than a week.

Lesser frigatebird, Fregata ariel
Christmas Island frigatebird, Fregata andrewsi
Great frigatebird, Fregata minor

Boobies and gannets
Order: SuliformesFamily: Sulidae

The sulids comprise the gannets and boobies. Both groups are medium to large coastal seabirds that plunge-dive for fish.

Brown booby, Sula leucogaster
Red-footed booby, Sula sula

Anhingas
Order: SuliformesFamily: Anhingidae

Anhingas or darters are often called "snake-birds" because of their long thin neck, which gives a snake-like appearance when they swim with their bodies submerged. The males have black and dark-brown plumage, an erectile crest on the nape and a larger bill than the female. The females have much paler plumage especially on the neck and underparts. The darters have completely webbed feet and their legs are short and set far back on the body. Their plumage is somewhat permeable, like that of cormorants, and they spread their wings to dry after diving.

Oriental darter, Anhinga melanogaster

Cormorants and shags
Order: SuliformesFamily: Phalacrocoracidae

Phalacrocoracidae is a family of medium to large coastal, fish-eating seabirds that includes cormorants and shags. Plumage coloration varies, with the majority having mainly dark plumage, some species being black-and-white and a few being colorful.

Great cormorant, Phalacrocorax carbo

Herons, egrets, and bitterns
Order: PelecaniformesFamily: Ardeidae

The family Ardeidae contains the bitterns, heron, and egrets. Herons and egrets are medium to large wading birds with long necks and legs. Bitterns tend to be shorter necked and more wary. Members of Ardeidae fly with their necks retracted, unlike other long-necked birds such as storks, ibises and spoonbills.

Great bittern, Botaurus stellaris
Yellow bittern, Ixobrychus sinensis
Schrenck's bittern, Ixobrychus eurhythmus
Cinnamon bittern, Ixobrychus cinnamomeus
Black bittern, Ixobrychus flavicollis
Gray heron, Ardea cinerea
Great-billed heron, Ardea sumatrana
Purple heron, Ardea purpurea
Great egret, Ardea alba
Intermediate egret, Ardea intermedia
Chinese egret, Egretta eulophotes
Little egret, Egretta garzetta
Pacific reef-heron, Egretta sacra
Cattle egret, Bubulcus ibis
Chinese pond-heron, Ardeola bacchus
Striated heron, Butorides striata
Black-crowned night-heron, Nycticorax nycticorax
Nankeen night-heron, Nycticorax caledonicus (A)
Japanese night-heron, Gorsachius goisagi
Malayan night-heron, Gorsachius melanolophus

Ibises and spoonbills
Order: PelecaniformesFamily: Threskiornithidae

Threskiornithidae is a family of large terrestrial and wading birds which includes the ibises and spoonbills. They have long, broad wings with 11 primary and about 20 secondary feathers. They are strong fliers and despite their size and weight, very capable soarers.

Black-faced spoonbill, Platalea minor

Osprey
Order: AccipitriformesFamily: Pandionidae

The family Pandionidae contains only one species, the osprey. The osprey is a medium-large raptor which is a specialist fish-eater with a worldwide distribution.

Osprey, Pandion haliaetus

Hawks, eagles, and kites
Order: AccipitriformesFamily: Accipitridae

Accipitridae is a family of birds of prey, which includes hawks, eagles, kites, harriers, and Old World vultures. These birds have powerful hooked beaks for tearing flesh from their prey, strong legs, powerful talons and keen eyesight.

Black-winged kite, Elanus caeruleus
Oriental honey-buzzard, Pernis ptilorhynchus
Jerdon's baza, Aviceda jerdoni
White-rumped vulture, Gyps bengalensis
Mountain serpent-eagle, Spilornis kinabaluensis
Crested serpent-eagle, Spilornis cheela
Bat hawk, Macheiramphus alcinus
Changeable hawk-eagle, Nisaetus cirrhatus
Blyth's hawk-eagle, Nisaetus alboniger
Wallace's hawk-eagle, Nisaetus nanus
Rufous-bellied eagle, Lophotriorchis kienerii
Black eagle, Ictinaetus malaiensis
Gray-faced buzzard, Butastur indicus
Eastern marsh-harrier, Circus spilonotus
Hen harrier, Circus cyaneus
Pied harrier, Circus melanoleucos
Crested goshawk, Accipiter trivirgatus
Chinese sparrowhawk, Accipiter soloensis
Japanese sparrowhawk, Accipiter gularis
Besra, Accipiter virgatus
Eurasian sparrowhawk, Accipiter nisus (A)
Black kite, Milvus migrans
Brahminy kite, Haliastur indus
White-bellied sea-eagle, Haliaeetus leucogaster
Lesser fish-eagle, Haliaeetus humilis
Gray-headed fish-eagle, Haliaeetus ichthyaetus

Barn-owls
Order: StrigiformesFamily: Tytonidae

Barn-owls are medium to large owls with large heads and characteristic heart-shaped faces. They have long strong legs with powerful talons. T

Oriental bay-owl, Phodilus badius

Owls
Order: StrigiformesFamily: Strigidae

The typical owls are small to large solitary nocturnal birds of prey. They have large forward-facing eyes and ears, a hawk-like beak and a conspicuous circle of feathers around each eye called a facial disk.

Reddish scops-owl, Otus rufescens
Mountain scops-owl, Otus spilocephalus
Collared scops-owl, Otus lettia
Sunda scops-owl, Otus lempiji
Barred eagle-owl, Bubo sumatranus
Buffy fish-owl, Ketupa ketupu
Sunda owlet, Taenioptynx sylvaticus
Brown wood-owl, Strix leptogrammica
Short-eared owl, Asio flammeus
Brown boobook, Ninox scutulata

Trogons
Order: TrogoniformesFamily: Trogonidae

The family Trogonidae includes trogons and quetzals. Found in tropical woodlands worldwide, they feed on insects and fruit, and their broad bills and weak legs reflect their diet and arboreal habits. Although their flight is fast, they are reluctant to fly any distance. Trogons have soft, often colorful, feathers with distinctive male and female plumage. 

Red-naped trogon, Harpactes kasumba
Diard's trogon, Harpactes diardii
Cinnamon-rumped trogon, Harpactes orrhophaeus
Scarlet-rumped trogon, Harpactes duvaucelii
Orange-breasted trogon, Harpactes oreskios

Hoopoes
Order: BucerotiformesFamily: Upupidae

Hoopoes have black, white and orangey-pink coloring with a large erectile crest on their head.

Eurasian hoopoe, Upupa epops (A)

Hornbills
Order: BucerotiformesFamily: Bucerotidae

Hornbills are a group of birds whose bill is shaped like a cow's horn, but without a twist, sometimes with a casque on the upper mandible. Frequently, the bill is brightly colored.

White-crowned hornbill, Berenicornis comatus
Helmeted hornbill, Buceros vigil
Rhinoceros hornbill, Buceros rhinoceros
Bushy-crested hornbill, Anorrhinus galeritus
Black hornbill, Anthracoceros malayanus
Oriental pied-hornbill, Anthracoceros albirostris
Wreathed hornbill, Rhyticeros undulatus
Wrinkled hornbill, Rhabdotorrhinus corrugatus

Kingfishers
Order: CoraciiformesFamily: Alcedinidae

Kingfishers are medium-sized birds with large heads, long, pointed bills, short legs and stubby tails.

Common kingfisher, Alcedo atthis
Blue-eared kingfisher, Alcedo meninting
Malaysian blue-banded kingfisher, Alcedo peninsulae
Black-backed kingfisher, Ceyx erithacus
Rufous-backed dwarf-kingfisher, Ceyx rufidorsa
Banded kingfisher, Lacedo pulchella
Stork-billed kingfisher, Pelargopsis capensis
Ruddy kingfisher, Halcyon coromanda
Black-capped kingfisher, Halcyon pileata
Sacred kingfisher, Todirhamphus sanctus
Collared kingfisher, Todirhamphus chloris
Rufous-collared kingfisher, Actenoides concretus

Bee-eaters
Order: CoraciiformesFamily: Meropidae

The bee-eaters are a group of near passerine birds in the family Meropidae. Most species are found in Africa but others occur in southern Europe, Madagascar, Australia and New Guinea. They are characterized by richly colored plumage, slender bodies, and usually elongated central tail feathers. All are colorful and have long downturned bills and pointed wings, which give them a swallow-like appearance when seen from afar.

Red-bearded bee-eater, Nyctyornis amictus
Blue-throated bee-eater, Merops viridis
Blue-tailed bee-eater, Merops philippinus
Rainbow bee-eater, Merops ornatus (A)

Rollers
Order: CoraciiformesFamily: Coraciidae

Rollers resemble crows in size and build, but are more closely related to the kingfishers and bee-eaters. They share the colorful appearance of those groups with blues and browns predominating. The two inner front toes are connected, but the outer toe is not. 

Dollarbird, Eurystomus orientalis

Asian barbets
Order: PiciformesFamily: Megalaimidae

The Asian barbets are plump birds, with short necks and large heads. They get their name from the bristles which fringe their heavy bills. Most species are brightly colored.

Brown barbet, Caloramphus fuliginosus
Blue-eared barbet, Psilopogon duvaucelii
Red-crowned barbet, Psilopogon rafflesii
Red-throated barbet, Psilopogon mystacophanos
Yellow-crowned barbet, Psilopogon henricii
Gold-whiskered barbet, Psilopogon chrysopogon

Honeyguides
Order: PiciformesFamily: Indicatoridae

Honeyguides are among the few birds that feed on wax. They are named for the greater honeyguide which leads traditional honey-hunters to bees' nests and, after the hunters have harvested the honey, feeds on the remaining contents of the hive.

Malaysian honeyguide, Indicator archipelagicus

Woodpeckers
Order: PiciformesFamily: Picidae

Woodpeckers are small to medium-sized birds with chisel-like beaks, short legs, stiff tails and long tongues used for capturing insects. Some species have feet with two toes pointing forward and two backward, while several species have only three toes. Many woodpeckers have the habit of tapping noisily on tree trunks with their beaks.

Rufous piculet, Sasia abnormis
Gray-and-buff woodpecker, Hemicircus concretus
Sunda pygmy woodpecker, Yungipicus moluccensis
Gray-capped pygmy woodpecker, Yungipicus canicapillus (A)
Maroon woodpecker, Blythipicus rubiginosus
Orange-backed woodpecker, Reinwardtipicus validus
Rufous woodpecker, Micropternus brachyurus
Buff-necked woodpecker, Meiglyptes tukki
Buff-rumped woodpecker, Meiglyptes tristis
Olive-backed woodpecker, Dinopium rafflesii
Common flameback, Dinopium javanense
Crimson-winged woodpecker, Picus puniceus
Banded woodpecker, Chrysophlegma mineaceum
Checker-throated woodpecker, Chrysophlegma mentale
Great slaty woodpecker, Mulleripicus pulverulentus
White-bellied woodpecker, Dryocopus javensis

Falcons and caracaras
Order: FalconiformesFamily: Falconidae

Falconidae is a family of diurnal birds of prey. They differ from hawks, eagles and kites in that they kill with their beaks instead of their talons. T

Black-thighed falconet, Microhierax fringillarius
Eurasian kestrel, Falco tinnunculus
Oriental hobby, Falco severus
Peregrine falcon, Falco peregrinus

Old world parrots
Order: PsittaciformesFamily: Psittaculidae

Characteristic features of parrots include a strong curved bill, an upright stance, strong legs, and clawed zygodactyl feet. Many parrots are vividly colored, and some are multi-colored. Old World parrots are found from Africa east across south and southeast Asia and Oceania to Australia and New Zealand.

Blue-rumped parrot, Psittinus cyanurus
Long-tailed parakeet, Psittacula longicauda
Blue-crowned hanging-parrot, Loriculus galgulus

African and green broadbills
Order: PasseriformesFamily: Calyptomenidae

The broadbills are small, brightly colored birds which feed on fruit and also take insects in flycatcher fashion, snapping their broad bills. Their habitat is canopies of wet forests.

Green broadbill, Calyptomena viridis

Asian and Grauer’s broadbills
Order: PasseriformesFamily: Eurylaimidae

The broadbills are small, brightly colored birds, which feed on fruit and also take insects in flycatcher fashion, snapping their broad bills. Their habitat is canopies of wet forests.

Long-tailed broadbill, Psarisomus dalhousiae
Dusky broadbill, Corydon sumatranus
Black-and-red broadbill, Cymbirhynchus macrorhynchos
Banded broadbill, Eurylaimus javanicus
Black-and-yellow broadbill, Eurylaimus ochromalus

Pittas
Order: PasseriformesFamily: Pittidae

Pittas are medium-sized by passerine standards and are stocky, with fairly long, strong legs, short tails and stout bills. Many, but not all, are brightly colored. They spend the majority of their time on wet forest floors, eating snails, insects and similar invertebrates.

Blue-banded pitta, Erythropitta arquata 
Garnet pitta, Erythropitta granatina
Giant pitta, Hydrornis caerulea
Bornean banded-pitta, Hydrornis schwaneri
Blue-headed pitta, Hydrornis baudii
Blue-winged pitta, Pitta moluccensis
Fairy pitta, Pitta nympha
Hooded pitta, Pitta sordida

Thornbills and allies
Order: PasseriformesFamily: Acanthizidae

Thornbills are small passerine birds, similar in habits to the tits.

Golden-bellied gerygone, Gerygone sulphurea

Cuckooshrikes
Order: PasseriformesFamily: Campephagidae

The cuckooshrikes are small to medium-sized passerine birds. They are predominantly grayish with white and black, although some species are brightly colored.

Fiery minivet, Pericrocotus igneus
Gray-chinned minivet, Pericrocotus solaris
Scarlet minivet, Pericrocotus flammeus
Bar-bellied cuckooshrike, Coracina striata
Pied triller, Lalage nigra
Lesser cuckooshrike, Lalage fimbriata

Vireos, shrike-babblers, and erpornis
Order: PasseriformesFamily: Vireonidae

Most of the members of this family are found in the New World. However, the shrike-babblers and erpornis, which only slightly resemble the "true" vireos and greenlets, are found in South East Asia.

White-browed shrike-babbler, Pteruthius flaviscapis
White-bellied erpornis, Erpornis zantholeuca

Whistlers and allies
Order: PasseriformesFamily: Pachycephalidae

The family Pachycephalidae includes the whistlers, shrikethrushes, and some of the pitohuis.

Bornean whistler, Pachycephala hypoxantha
Mangrove whistler, Pachycephala cinerea

Old World orioles
Order: PasseriformesFamily: Oriolidae

The Old World orioles are colorful passerine birds. They are not related to the New World orioles. 

Dark-throated oriole, Oriolus xanthonotus
Black-naped oriole, Oriolus chinensis
Black-and-crimson oriole, Oriolus cruentus

Woodswallows, bellmagpies, and allies
Order: PasseriformesFamily: Artamidae

The woodswallows are soft-plumaged, somber-colored passerine birds. They are smooth, agile flyers with moderately large, semi-triangular wings. 

White-breasted woodswallow, Artamus leucorynchus

Vangas, helmetshrikes, and allies
Order: PasseriformesFamily: Vangidae

The family Vangidae is highly variable, though most members of it resemble true shrikes to some degree.

Large woodshrike, Tephrodornis virgatus
Bar-winged flycatcher-shrike, Hemipus picatus
Black-winged flycatcher-shrike, Hemipus hirundinaceus
Rufous-winged philentoma, Philentoma pyrhopterum
Maroon-breasted philentoma, Philentoma velatum

Bristlehead
Order: PasseriformesFamily: Pityriasidae

The Bornean bristlehead is large black bird with a red and yellow head. Females also have some red in the wings. It has a massive heavy black hooked bill and a short tail. The crown of the head has short, colored projections like bare feather shaft, hence the name "bristlehead".

Bornean bristlehead, Pityriasis gymnocephala

Ioras
Order: PasseriformesFamily: Aegithinidae

The ioras are bulbul-like birds of open forest or thorn scrub, but whereas that group tends to be drab in coloration, ioras are sexually dimorphic, with the males being brightly plumaged in yellows and greens. 

Common iora, Aegithina tiphia
Green iora, Aegithina viridissima

Fantails
Order: PasseriformesFamily: Rhipiduridae

The fantails are small insectivorous birds which are specialist aerial feeders.

Spotted fantail, Rhipidura perlata
Malaysian pied-fantail, Rhipidura javanica
White-throated fantail, Rhipidura albicollis

Drongos
Order: PasseriformesFamily: Dicruridae

The drongos are mostly black or dark gray in color, sometimes with metallic tints. They have long forked tails, and some Asian species have elaborate tail decorations. They have short legs and sit very upright while perched, like a shrike. They flycatch or take prey from the ground.

Ashy drongo, Dicrurus leucophaeus
Crow-billed drongo, Dicrurus annectens
Bronzed drongo, Dicrurus aeneus
Hair-crested drongo, Dicrurus hottentottus
Greater racket-tailed drongo, Dicrurus paradiseus

Monarch flycatchers
Order: PasseriformesFamily: Monarchidae

The monarch flycatchers are small to medium-sized insectivorous passerines which hunt by flycatching.

Black-naped monarch, Hypothymis azurea
Blyth's paradise-flycatcher, Terpsiphone affinis

Crested shrikejay
Order: PasseriformesFamily: Platylophidae

Until 2018 this species was included in family Corvidae, but genetic and morphological evidence place it in its own family.

Crested shrikejay, Platylophus galericulatus

Shrikes
Order: PasseriformesFamily: Laniidae

Shrikes are passerine birds known for their habit of catching other birds and small animals and impaling the uneaten portions of their bodies on thorns. A typical shrike's beak is hooked, like a bird of prey.

Tiger shrike, Lanius tigrinus
Brown shrike, Lanius cristatus

Crows, jays, and magpies
Order: PasseriformesFamily: Corvidae

The family Corvidae includes crows, ravens, jays, choughs, magpies, treepies, nutcrackers and ground jays. Corvids are above average in size among the Passeriformes, and some of the larger species show high levels of intelligence.

Black magpie, Platysmurus leucopterus
Common green-magpie, Cissa chinensis
Bornean green-magpie, Cissa jefferyi
Slender-billed crow, Corvus enca

Rail-babbler
Order: PasseriformesFamily: Eupetidae

Eupetidae is a monotypic family; its sole species occurs in Brunei.

Malaysian rail-babbler, Eupetes macrocerus

Fairy flycatchers
Order: PasseriformesFamily: Stenostiridae

Most of the species of this small family are found in Africa, though a few inhabit tropical Asia. They are not closely related to other birds called "flycatchers".

Gray-headed canary-flycatcher, Culicicapa ceylonensis

Tits, chickadees, and titmice
Order: PasseriformesFamily: Paridae

The Paridae are mainly small stocky woodland species with short stout bills. Some have crests. They are adaptable birds, with a mixed diet including seeds and insects.

Cinereous tit, Parus cinereus

Cisticolas and allies
Order: PasseriformesFamily: Cisticolidae

The Cisticolidae are warblers found mainly in warmer southern regions of the Old World. They are generally very small birds of drab brown or gray appearance found in open country such as grassland or scrub. 

Dark-necked tailorbird, Orthotomus atrogularis
Ashy tailorbird, Orthotomus ruficeps
Rufous-tailed tailorbird, Orthotomus sericeus
Yellow-bellied prinia, Prinia flaviventris

Reed warblers and allies 
Order: PasseriformesFamily: Acrocephalidae

The members of this family are usually rather large for "warblers". Most are rather plain olivaceous brown above with much yellow to beige below. They are usually found in open woodland, reedbeds, or tall grass. The family occurs mostly in southern to western Eurasia and surroundings, but it also ranges far into the Pacific, with some species in Africa.

Oriental reed warbler, Acrocephalus orientalis
Clamorous reed warbler, Acrocephalus stentoreus

Grassbirds and allies
Order: PasseriformesFamily: Locustellidae

Locustellidae are a family of small insectivorous songbirds found mainly in Eurasia, Africa, and the Australian region. They are smallish birds with tails that are usually long and pointed, and tend to be drab brownish or buffy all over.

Pallas's grasshopper warbler, Helopsaltes certhiola
Middendorff's grasshopper warbler, Helopsaltes ochotensis
Lanceolated warbler, Locustella lanceolata
Striated grassbird, Megalurus palustris

Swallows
Order: PasseriformesFamily: Hirundinidae

The family Hirundinidae is adapted to aerial feeding. They have a slender streamlined body, long pointed wings and a short bill with a wide gape. The feet are adapted to perching rather than walking, and the front toes are partially joined at the base.

Bank swallow, Riparia riparia
Barn swallow, Hirundo rustica
Pacific swallow, Hirundo tahitica
Red-rumped swallow, Cecropis daurica
Striated swallow, Cecropis striolata

Bulbuls
Order: PasseriformesFamily: Pycnonotidae

Bulbuls are medium-sized songbirds. Some are colorful with yellow, red or orange vents, cheeks, throats or supercilia, but most are drab, with uniform olive-brown to black plumage. Some species have distinct crests.

Black-and-white bulbul, Brachypodius melanoleucus
Puff-backed bulbul, Brachypodius eutilotus
Black-headed bulbul, Brachypodius melanocephalos
Spectacled bulbul, Rubigula erythropthalmos
Gray-bellied bulbul, Rubigula cyaniventris
Scaly-breasted bulbul, Rubigula squamatus
Bornean bulbul, Rubigula montis
Straw-headed bulbul, Pycnonotus zeylanicus
Yellow-vented bulbul, Pycnonotus goiavier
Olive-winged bulbul, Pycnonotus plumosus
Cream-eyed bulbul, Pycnonotus pseudosimplex
Cream-vented bulbul, Pycnonotus simplex
Red-eyed bulbul, Pycnonotus brunneus
Hairy-backed bulbul, Tricholestes criniger
Hook-billed bulbul, Setornis criniger
Finsch's bulbul, Alophoixus finschii
Yellow-bellied bulbul, Alophoixus phaeocephalus
Gray-cheeked bulbul, Alophoixus tephrogenys
Penan bulbul, Alophoixus ruficrissus
Charlotte's bulbul, Iole charlottae
Streaked bulbul, Ixos malaccensis

Leaf warblers
Order: PasseriformesFamily: Phylloscopidae

Leaf warblers are a family of small insectivorous birds found mostly in Eurasia and ranging into Wallacea and Africa. The species are of various sizes, often green-plumaged above and yellow below, or more subdued with greyish-green to greyish-brown colors.

Japanese leaf warbler, Phylloscopus xanthodryas
Arctic warbler, Phylloscopus borealis
Kamchatka leaf warbler, Phylloscopus examinandus
Yellow-breasted warbler, Phylloscopus montis
Mountain leaf warbler, Phylloscopus trivirgatus

Bush warblers and allies
Order: PasseriformesFamily: Scotocercidae

The members of this family are found throughout Africa, Asia, and Polynesia. Their taxonomy is in flux, and some authorities place some genera in other families.

Yellow-bellied warbler, Abroscopus superciliaris
Mountain tailorbird, Phyllergates cuculatus
Aberrant bush warbler, Horornis flavolivaceus

White-eyes, yuhinas, and allies
Order: PasseriformesFamily: Zosteropidae

The white-eyes are small and mostly undistinguished, their plumage above being generally some dull color like greenish-olive, but some species have a white or bright yellow throat, breast or lower parts, and several have buff flanks. As their name suggests, many species have a white ring around each eye. 

Hume's white-eye, Zosterops auriventer

Tree-babblers, scimitar-babblers, and allies
Order: PasseriformesFamily: Timaliidae

The babblers, or timaliids, are somewhat diverse in size and coloration, but are characterized by soft fluffy plumage.

Bold-striped tit-babbler, Mixornis bornensis
Fluffy-backed tit-babbler, Macronus ptilosus
Gray-hooded babbler, Cyanoderma bicolor
Rufous-fronted babbler, Cyanoderma rufifrons
Sunda scimitar-babbler, Pomatorhinus bornensis
Black-throated babbler, Stachyris nigricollis
Chestnut-rumped babbler, Stachyris maculata
Gray-throated babbler, Stachyris nigriceps
Gray-headed babbler, Stachyris poliocephala

Ground babblers and allies
Order: PasseriformesFamily: Pellorneidae

These small to medium-sized songbirds have soft fluffy plumage but are otherwise rather diverse. Members of the genus Illadopsis are found in forests, but some other genera are birds of scrublands.

Sooty-capped babbler, Malacopteron affine
Gray-breasted babbler, Malacopteron albogulare
Scaly-crowned babbler, Malacopteron cinereum
Rufous-crowned babbler, Malacopteron magnum
Moustached babbler, Malacopteron magnirostre
Black-capped babbler, Pellorneum capistratum
Short-tailed babbler, Pellorneum malaccense
Temminck's babbler, Pellorneum pyrrogenys
White-chested babbler, Pellorneum rostratum
Ferruginous babbler, Pellorneum bicolor
Abbott's babbler, Malacocincla abbotti
Horsfield's babbler, Malacocincla sepiaria
Bornean wren-babbler, Ptilocichla leucogrammica

Laughingthrushes and allies
Order: PasseriformesFamily: Leiothrichidae

The members of this family are diverse in size and colouration, though those of genus Turdoides tend to be brown or greyish. The family is found in Africa, India, and southeast Asia.

Brown fulvetta, Alcippe brunneicauda

Nuthatches
Order: PasseriformesFamily: Sittidae

Nuthatches are small woodland birds. They have the unusual ability to climb down trees head first, unlike other birds which can only go upwards. Nuthatches have big heads, short tails and powerful bills and feet.

Velvet-fronted nuthatch, Sitta frontalis

Starlings
Order: PasseriformesFamily: Sturnidae

Starlings are small to medium-sized passerine birds. Their flight is strong and direct and they are very gregarious. Their preferred habitat is fairly open country. They eat insects and fruit. Plumage is typically dark with a metallic sheen.

Asian glossy starling, Aplonis panayensis
Common hill myna, Gracula religiosa
Chestnut-cheeked starling, Agropsar philippensis
Black-collared starling, Gracupica nigricollis (I)
Common myna, Acridotheres tristis (I)
Javan myna, Acridotheres javanicus (I)
Crested myna, Acridotheres cristatellus

Thrushes and allies
Order: PasseriformesFamily: Turdidae

The thrushes are a group of passerine birds that occur mainly in the Old World. They are plump, soft plumaged, small to medium-sized insectivores or sometimes omnivores, often feeding on the ground. Many have attractive songs.

Fruit-hunter, Chlamydochaera jefferyi 
Chestnut-capped thrush, Geokichla interpres
Orange-headed thrush, Geokichla citrina
Eyebrowed thrush, Turdus obscurus
Pale thrush, Turdus pallidus
Island thrush, Turdus poliocephalus

Old World flycatchers
Order: PasseriformesFamily: Muscicapidae

Old World flycatchers are a large group of small passerine birds native to the Old World. They are mainly small arboreal insectivores. The appearance of these birds is highly varied, but they mostly have weak songs and harsh calls.
 

Dark-sided flycatcher, Muscicapa sibirica
Asian brown flycatcher, Muscicapa dauurica
Oriental magpie-robin, Copsychus saularis
Rufous-tailed shama, Copsychus pyrropygus
White-crowned shama, Copsychus stricklandii
Pale blue flycatcher, Cyornis unicolor
Dayak blue flycatcher, Cyornis montanus
Sunda blue flycatcher, Cyornis caerulatus
Malaysian blue flycatcher, Cyornis turcosus
Bornean blue flycatcher, Cyornis superbus
Mangrove blue flycatcher, Cyornis rufigastra
Brown-chested jungle-flycatcher, Cyornis brunneatus (A)
Gray-chested jungle-flycatcher, 	Cyornis umbratilis
Fulvous-chested jungle-flycatcher, Cyornis olivaceus
Chestnut-tailed jungle-flycatcher, Cyornis ruficauda
Blue-and-white flycatcher, Cyanoptila cyanomelana
Verditer flycatcher, Eumyias thalassina
Eyebrowed jungle-flycatcher, Vauriella gularis 
Bornean shortwing, Brachypteryx erythrogyna
Bornean whistling-thrush, Myophonus borneensis
Bornean forktail, Enicurus borneensis
Siberian rubythroat, Calliope calliope
Mugimaki flycatcher, Ficedula mugimaki
Snowy-browed flycatcher, Ficedula hyperythra
Taiga flycatcher, Ficedula albicilla
Rufous-chested flycatcher, Ficedula dumetoria
Blue rock-thrush, Monticola solitarius
Siberian stonechat, Saxicola maurus
Amur stonechat, Saxicola stejnegeri

Flowerpeckers
Order: PasseriformesFamily: Dicaeidae

The flowerpeckers are very small, stout, often brightly colored birds, with short tails, short thick curved bills and tubular tongues.

Yellow-breasted flowerpecker, Prionochilus maculatus
Crimson-breasted flowerpecker, Prionochilus percussus
Yellow-rumped flowerpecker, Prionochilus xanthopygius
Scarlet-breasted flowerpecker, Prionochilus thoracicus
Spectacled flowerpecker, Dicaeum dayakorum (A)
Brown-backed flowerpecker, Dicaeum everetti
Yellow-vented flowerpecker, Dicaeum chrysorrheum
Orange-bellied flowerpecker, Dicaeum trigonostigma
Plain flowerpecker, Dicaeum minullum
Scarlet-backed flowerpecker, Dicaeum cruentatum

Sunbirds and spiderhunters
Order: PasseriformesFamily: Nectariniidae

The sunbirds and spiderhunters are very small passerine birds which feed largely on nectar, although they will also take insects, especially when feeding young. Flight is fast and direct on their short wings. Most species can take nectar by hovering like a hummingbird, but usually perch to feed. 

Ruby-cheeked sunbird, Chalcoparia singalensis
Plain sunbird, Anthreptes simplex
Brown-throated sunbird, Anthreptes malacensis
Red-throated sunbird, Anthreptes rhodolaema
Van Hasselt's sunbird, Leptocoma brasiliana
Copper-throated sunbird, Leptocoma calcostetha
Olive-backed sunbird, Cinnyris jugularis
Temminck's sunbird, Aethopyga temminckii
Crimson sunbird, Aethopyga siparaja
Purple-naped sunbird, Hypogramma hypogrammicum
Thick-billed spiderhunter, Arachnothera crassirostris
Long-billed spiderhunter, Arachnothera robusta
Little spiderhunter, Arachnothera longirostra
Yellow-eared spiderhunter, Arachnothera chrysogenys
Spectacled spiderhunter, Arachnothera flavigaster
Gray-breasted spiderhunter, Arachnothera modesta
Bornean spiderhunter, Arachnothera everetti

Fairy-bluebirds
Order: PasseriformesFamily: Irenidae

The fairy-bluebirds are bulbul-like birds of open forest or thorn scrub. The males are dark-blue and the females a duller green.

Asian fairy-bluebird, Irena puella

Leafbirds
Order: PasseriformesFamily: Chloropseidae

The leafbirds are small, bulbul-like birds. The males are brightly plumaged, usually in greens and yellows.

Greater green leafbird, Chloropsis sonnerati
Lesser green leafbird, Chloropsis cyanopogon
Blue-winged leafbird, Chloropsis cochinchinensis
Bornean leafbird, Chloropsis kinabaluensis

Waxbills and allies
Order: PasseriformesFamily: Estrildidae

The estrildid finches are small passerine birds of the Old World tropics and Australasia. They are gregarious and often colonial seed eaters with short thick but pointed bills. They are all similar in structure and habits, but have a wide variation in plumage colors and patterns.

Java sparrow, Padda oryzivora (I)
Scaly-breasted munia, Lonchura punctulata
Dusky munia, Lonchura fuscans
White-bellied munia, Lonchura leucogastra
Chestnut munia, Lonchura atricapilla
Pin-tailed parrotfinch, Erythrura prasina
Tawny-breasted parrotfinch, Erythrura hyperythra

Old World sparrows

Order: PasseriformesFamily: Passeridae

Old World sparrows are small passerine birds. In general, sparrows tend to be small, plump, brown or gray birds with short tails and short powerful beaks. Sparrows are seed eaters, but they also consume small insects.

Eurasian tree sparrow, Passer montanus

Wagtails and pipits
Order: PasseriformesFamily: Motacillidae

Motacillidae is a family of small passerine birds with medium to long tails. They include the wagtails, longclaws and pipits. They are slender, ground feeding insectivores of open country. 

Gray wagtail, Motacilla cinerea
Western yellow wagtail, Motacilla flava
Eastern yellow wagtail, Motacilla tschutschensis
White wagtail, Motacilla alba
Paddyfield pipit, Anthus rufulus
Olive-backed pipit, Anthus hodgsoni
Pechora pipit, Anthus gustavi
Red-throated pipit, Anthus cervinus

Old World buntings
Order: PasseriformesFamily: Emberizidae

The emberizids are a large family of passerine birds. They are seed-eating birds with distinctively shaped bills. Many emberizid species have distinctive head patterns.

Black-headed bunting, Emberiza melanocephala (A)
Yellow-breasted bunting, Emberiza aureola

See also
List of birds
Lists of birds by region

References

'
birds
Brunei
Brunei